Mongnai, also known as Möngnai, Mone, Mōng Nai or Monē, was a Shan state in what is today Burma. It belonged to the Eastern Division of the Southern Shan States. Its capital was Mongnai town.

History
Möngnai state was founded before 1800. According to tradition a predecessor state named Saturambha had existed previously in the area.

Mongnai included the substates of Kengtawng and Kenghkam. The latter was annexed in 1882.

Rulers (title Myoza) 
c. 1802 – 1848: Maung Shwe Paw
1848–1850: Maung Yit
1850–1851: U Po Ka
1852: U Shwe Kyu

Rulers (title Saopha) 
Ritual style Kambawsa Rahta Mahawunthiri Pawara Thudamaraza.

Saophas:
 1312–1339: Khun Khrua
 1567–1568: Hso Hpoek Hpa
 1568–1585: Sao Piam Hpa
 1585–1631: Representative of Myanmar officers
 1631–1675: Sao Hla Hkam (son of Saopha of Momeik)
 1675–1678: Sao Kyam Hkam (son of Sao Hla Hkam)
 1678–1704: Sao Hso Hom (son of Sao Kyam Hkam)
 1704–1728: Sao Hkun Arn (son of Sao Hseua Hom)
 1728–1746: Sao Hso Hkam (son of Sao Hkun Arn)
 1746–1772: Shwe Myat Noe (son of Sao Hseua Hkam)
 1772–1790: Shwe Myat Kyaw (son of Shwe Myat Noe)
 1790–1811: Hkun Shwe Wa (son of Shwe Myat Kyaw)
 1811–1842: Hkun Hsen Kyung (son of Sao Maha Hpom Saopha of Kyaingtong)
 1842–1852: Hkun Nu Nom (son of Hkun Kyung)
 1852–1875: Hkun Hpo On (son of Hkun Nu Nom)
 1875–1882: Hkun Kyi (1st time) the uncle of Hkun Hpo On
 1882–1888: Twet Nga Lu (usurper) (d. 1888)
 1888–1914: Hkun Kyi (2nd time) the uncle of Hkun Hpo On
 6 May 1914 – 1928: Hkun Kyaw Sam
 1928–1949: Hkun Kyaw Ho
 1949–1958: Sao Pyea (last Saopha of Mone')

References

External links
"Gazetteer of Upper Burma and the Shan states"
The Imperial Gazetteer of India

Shan States

ca:Mongnai